List of diplomats from the Kingdom of England and Great Britain to the Republic of Genoa

Envoys Extraordinary of England (to 1707)
 1697–1698 and 1702–1705: Sir Lambert Blackwell
 1705: Col. Mitford Crowe Resident
 1706–1707: Dr Henry Newton (usually absent)

Envoys Extraordinary of Great Britain (from 1707)
 1707–1711: Dr Henry Newton (usually absent)
 1708–1713: William Richard Chetwynd Resident 1708–1711; then Envoy Extraordinary
 1710: John Molesworth Envoy Extraordinary
 1714–1722: Henry Davenant
No formal representation 1722–1763, other than Consuls
 c.1723–1738: John Bagshaw Consul
 c.1738–c.1756: John Birtles Consul
 c.1758–1775: James Hollford Consul
Ministers
 1763: Capt Augustus Harvey Minister
 1763–1766: Commodore Thomas Harrison Minister
 1767–1769: Commodore Richard Spey Minister
No formal diplomatic representation 1769–1793, other than Consuls
 1786 to 1786: John Collet, Consul
Minister Plenipoteniary
 1793–1795: Francis Drake Minister Plenipotentiary
 1786–1797: Joseph Brame, Consul, 1795–1797 in charge
 1797–1803: James Bird, Vice-consul, Acting Consul

British Representatives to Genoa since 1797

Great Britain became the United Kingdom of Great Britain and Ireland in 1801; the city and republic of Genoa also transferred through several changes of national status during the 19th century.

France 1797 to 1814
In 1797, the Republic passed into French control as the Ligurian Republic, and was formally annexed to France in 1805 as the département of Gênes.

Kingdom of Sardinia 1814 to 1861
At the 1814 Congress of Vienna, Genoa became part of the Kingdom of Sardinia.
Britain continued to appoint Consuls to the city.
 1840–1857: Timothy Yeats Brown Consul-General
 1856: Edward Algernoon Le Mesurier, Consul-general; Montague Yeats-Brown Vice-Consul
 1858–1893: Montague Yeats-Brown Consul

Kingdom of Italy, 1861
The Kingdom of Sardinia became the core of the Kingdom of Italy in 1861.

 1893:  Charles Alfred Payton, Consul
 1908:  William Keene MVO, Consul
 1918:  Edward C Blech CMG, Consul-General
 1920: William H.M. Sinclair, Consul; James R Murray Vice-Consul
 1922: Harry Churchill CMG, Consul-General
 1925: Robert Erskine Consul-General, C. F. W. Andrews Vice-Consul
 1930: Edward William Paget Thurstan, CMG Consul-General; I. L. Henderson Vice-Consul
 1935: A. G. Major Consul-General; W. J. Sullivan Vice-Consul
 1940: W. S. Edmonds CMG, OBE Consul-General; Donald CameronVice-Consul

Italian Republic, 1946
Consuls were appointed to Genoa from 1950 until 1995; since when all consuls have been honorary.

References

Genoa
Great Britain
Foreign relations of the Republic of Genoa